Distributed Research using Advanced Computing (DiRAC) is an integrated supercomputing facility used for research in particle physics, astronomy and cosmology in the United Kingdom. DiRAC makes use of multi-core processors and provides a variety of computer architectures for use by the research community.

DiRAC and DiRAC II
Initially DiRAC was funded with an investment of £12 million from the Government of the United Kingdom's Large Facilities Capital Fund combined with funds from the Science and Technology Facilities Council (STFC) and a consortium of universities in the UK.  In 2012, the DiRAC facility was  upgraded with a further £15 million of UK government capital  to create DiRAC II which has five installations:

 University of Cambridge HPC Service with 10000 cores and 1 Petabyte clustered file system
 Cambridge Cosmos shared memory Service with 1856 cores, 14 Terabytes of globally shared memory with Intel Xeon Phi coprocessors
 University of Leicester IT Services with 4352 cores and nonblocking minimal spanning switches
 The Institute for Computational Cosmology (ICC) at Durham University Service with 32384 cores
 University of Edinburgh 6144 node IBM Blue Gene/Q with 65000 cores and torus interconnects at EPCC

Paul Dirac
DiRAC is a backronym which honours the theoretical physicist and Nobel laureate Paul Dirac.

References

College and university associations and consortia in the United Kingdom
Information technology organisations based in the United Kingdom
Science and Technology Facilities Council
Supercomputers